Ringlestone is a suburb and housing estate in the town of Maidstone, Kent, England. It is on the eastern side of the River Medway, near Allington,  from Maidstone town centre.  

The area was originally part of the estate surrounding Park House, owned by Edmund Law Lushington, professor of Greek and later Lord Rector of the University of Glasgow. His friend and brother-in-law, Lord Tennyson was a frequent visitor, and it is believed Tennyson's poems The Brook and The Princess were inspired by his visits. 

The house was acquired in 1936 to the military to form Invicta Park Barracks, while some of the land was used to develop houses, which forms the eastern part of the estate today.

The estate has two small shops and an Esso petrol station. There are plans to move St Faith's Church, based near Maidstone East station in the town centre to Ringlestone, in a new building on the site of the existing community centre.

References 

Villages in Kent
Maidstone